Kyaw San or Kyaw Hsan is a Burmese politician and the current Mayor of  Mandalay, the second largest city in Myanmar. He became mayor after Ye Lwin. He is also the  minister for Ministry of Municipal of Mandalay Region Government under Maung Ko. He previously served under Ye Myint as the Regional Minister of Road Transport from 2011 to 2016.

Mayoral Career 
Following the coup d'état on February 1, 2021, State Administration Council appointed Kyaw San as mayor. After the formation of the caretaker government on August 1, 2021, the mayors of Yangon and Mandalay were appointed as municipal ministers in the reformation of state and region governments.

References 

Mayors of Mandalay
Living people
Year of birth missing (living people)